Ed Kevin Kokorović (born 4 January 1995) is a German-born, Croatian footballer who plays as a midfielder for Cres.

Club career
On mid January 2019, Kokorović joined 1. SC Znojmo in the Czech National Football League. But about one month later, he regret, and instead joined SV Lafnitz in Austria. In August 2019 he joined Lynx, making his debut on 12 August against Mons Calpe.

Career statistics

Club

Notes

References

External links
Ed Kokorović at SV Lafnitz
 Austrian career stats - ÖFB

1995 births
Living people
People from Ludwigsburg
Sportspeople from Stuttgart (region)
Association football midfielders
Croatian footballers
HNK Rijeka players
NK Pomorac 1921 players
HNK Rijeka II players
NK Zavrč players
FC Koper players
NK Istra 1961 players
Académico de Viseu F.C. players
1. SC Znojmo players
SV Lafnitz players
Lynx F.C. players
FC Slavoj Vyšehrad players
HNK Orijent players
First Football League (Croatia) players
Slovenian PrvaLiga players
Croatian Football League players
Liga Portugal 2 players
2. Liga (Austria) players
Gibraltar Premier Division players
Czech National Football League players
Croatian expatriate footballers
Expatriate footballers in Slovenia
Croatian expatriate sportspeople in Slovenia
Expatriate footballers in Portugal
Croatian expatriate sportspeople in Portugal
Expatriate footballers in Austria
Croatian expatriate sportspeople in Austria
Expatriate footballers in Gibraltar
Croatian expatriate sportspeople in Gibraltar
Expatriate footballers in the Czech Republic
Croatian expatriate sportspeople in the Czech Republic